The 1934–35 Swiss National Ice Hockey Championship was the 25th edition of the national ice hockey championship in Switzerland. HC Davos won the championship by finishing first in the final round.

First round

Western Series

Eastern Series

Central Series

Final round

External links 
Swiss Ice Hockey Federation – All-time results

Swiss
National